The Coordenadoria de Recursos Especiais (Portuguese for Coordination of Special Assets), best known by its acronym CORE, is the police tactical unit of the Civil Police of Rio de Janeiro State. It was formed on 4 July 1969 and is comparable to São Paulo's GOE.

Duties
 Operations against organized crime
 High-risk arrests
 High-risk VIP's escort

Services

Its structure is composed of the following operating units:

 Serviço de Operações e Táticas Especiais (SOTE) - Special Operations and Tactics Service
 Seção de Snipers; - Sniper Section
 Seção de Operações Táticas (SOT) - Tactical Operations Section
 Grupo de Operações Especiais (GOE) - Special Operations Group
 Seção de Operações Aéreas (SOA) - Air Operations Section
 Seção de Operações Marítimas e Ribeirinhas (SOMAR) - Maritime and Riverine Operations Section
 Seção de Gerenciamento de Crises (SGC) - Crisis Management Section
 Seção de Treinamento Especializado (STE) - Specialized Training Section
 Seção de Logística e Equipamentos (SLE) - Logistic and Equipment Section
 Serviço de Apoio Policial (SAP) - Police Support Service
 Serviço de Planejamento Operacional (SPO) - Operational Planning Service
 Serviço Aeropolicial (SAER) - Air Police Service
 Esquadrão Anti-bomba (EAB) - Bomb Squad
 Serviço de Suporte Operacional (SESOP) - Operational Support Service

Weapons
 Glock pistols	
 Heckler & Koch MP5
 FN FAL
 M16A2 Commando
 Colt M4 MONOLITHIC CQB
 Armalite Ar10
 Armalite SuperSASS
 Minimi MK2

Armoured Vehicles

CORE has armoured vehicles, popularly known caveirões, used mainly in operations where conflict with drug traffickers is likely. The main purpose of these armoured vehicles is to protect trim elements and destroy barriers used by drug traffickers. Armoured vehicles are still essential in supporting the rescue of trapped police units and in removing the wounded from confrontations.

Bibliography
 MAULAZ, Paulo - Operações Especiais, Rio de Janeiro, PCERJ, 2006. (Port)

Gallery

See also
 Civil Police (Brazil)
 Civil Police of Rio de Janeiro State
 GOE (Brazil)
 GATE (Brazil)
 List of police tactical units

References

External links
 Civil Police of Rio de Janeiro State official website, in Portuguese
CORE - Air operations 
November operations  (in Portuguese)

Rio de Janeiro
Special forces of Brazil
Government agencies established in 1969
1969 establishments in Brazil
Government of Rio de Janeiro (state)
Specialist police agencies of Brazil